This is a list of Ministers of University and Research since 1962. From 2001 to 2006 and from 2008 to 2019 the office had been incorporated with the office of Minister of Public Education into the office of Minister of Education, Universities and Research.

The current office holder is Anna Maria Bernini, a member of Forza Italia who has been serving in the cabinet of Giorgia Meloni since October 2022.

List of Education Ministers
 Parties
 

 

 

Coalitions

Timeline

References

Minister of University and Research
Ministers of University and Research
University and Research